The 2009 United Kingdom Budget, officially known as Budget 2009: Building Britain's Future, was formally delivered by Alistair Darling in the House of Commons on 22 April 2009. It introduced new tax, spending and debt rises in a financial environment of rising unemployment and recession.

Details 

To stimulate the motor industry, a £2,000 scrappage allowance was announced for a car more than 10 years old, if it is traded in for a new car and if it has been in the car buyer's ownership for the previous 12 months.  £1,000 of this is to be provided by the government, and £1,000 by a motor manufacturer.  The scheme started about mid-May 2009 and was planned to finish at the end of February 2010; however, before it was due to end, it was extended by one month, to the end of March 2010.

For high earners, a 50% tax band was announced for earners of over £150,000 per year to start in April 2010, and tax relief on pension contributions was reduced progressively from 40% to 20% for annual incomes between £150,000 and £180,000 and to 20% above £180,000 commencing April 2011.

Starting in April 2010, those with annual incomes over £100,000 would see their Personal allowance reduced by £1 for every £2 earned over £100,000, until the Personal allowance was reduced to zero, which (in 2010) would occur at an income of £112,950. This had the effect of creating an anomalous effective 60% marginal tax rate in the income band between £100,000 and £112,950, with the marginal tax rate returning to 40% above £112,950. As the Personal allowance has grown over the years, this has resulted in a corresponding increase in the size of the anomalous effective 60% tax band. As of 2018, the effective 60% marginal tax rate now arises for incomes between £100,000 and £123,700.

For savers, limits in Individual Savings Account (ISA) accounts were increased in two phases to a total of £10,200, including an additional £1,500 to the previous upper limit of £3,600 in a cash ISA.  The first phase is for those over age 50 years, who can contribute additional amounts from 6 October 2009.

Taxes

Spending

See also 
 Budget of the United Kingdom

References

External links 

 Budget 2009: Building Britain's future, HM Treasury web page (now at The National Archives)
 
 

Budget
2009
United Kingdom budget
April 2009 events in the United Kingdom